Heintzichthys is an extinct monospecific genus of arthrodire placoderm that lived what is now Europe and North America during the Famennian stage of the Late Devonian period. The type specimen was discovered in the Cleveland Shale near Cleveland, Ohio, in the United States.

Phylogeny
Heintzichthys is a member of the family Selenosteidae of the clade Aspinothoracidi, which belongs to the clade Pachyosteomorphi, one of the two major clades within Eubrachythoraci. The cladogram below shows the phylogeny of Heintzichthys:

According to a 2022 Jobbins et al. study, Heintzichthys was found to be a sister taxa to Gorgonichthys.

References 

Selenosteidae
Arthrodire genera
Placoderms of Europe
Placoderms of North America
Late Devonian animals